Glen Johnson (born 1984) is an English former footballer.

Glen Johnson may also refer to:

 Glen Johnson (boxer) (born 1969), Jamaican boxer
 Glen Johnson (footballer, born 1952), English footballer
 Glen Johnson (soccer) (born 1951), former Canadian soccer player
 Glen D. Johnson (1911–1983), U.S. Representative from Oklahoma
 Glen D. Johnson Jr. (born 1954), Chancellor of the Oklahoma State System of Higher Education
 Glen Johnson, a musician of the group Piano Magic

See also
 Glenn Johnson (disambiguation)
 Glenroy T. Johnson, West Indian cricket umpire